Gannon Buhr is a disc golfer who won the United States Disc Golf Championship in 2022. He is considered one of the best disc golfers in the world and for most of the 2022 season has been ranked in the top five. He is the youngest player ever to win the United States Disc Golf Championship, as well as the second youngest to ever win a major.

In February 2023, Buhr was sued by sponsor Prodigy Discs for attempted early termination of his endorsement contract.

References 

American disc golfers
People from Urbandale, Iowa
Living people
Year of birth missing (living people)
Sportspeople from Iowa